Pochinok is a rural locality (a village) in Spasskoye Rural Settlement, Vologodsky District, Vologda Oblast, Russia. The population was 2 as of 2002.

Geography 
The distance to Vologda is 67.6 km, to Nepotyagovo is 32 km. Kruglitsa is the nearest rural locality.

References 

Rural localities in Vologodsky District